'Engineer-in-Chief or E-in-C', is a Colonel Commandant of the Pakistan Army Corps of Engineers, Frontier Works Organisation and the Military Engineering Services of Pakistan. In the Pakistan Army, the Engineer-in-Chief is a chief engineer and topographer of the Army and currently holds the rank of Lieutenant General, advises the Pakistan Army in matters of science, engineering, and technology.

Lt Gen Kashif Nazir  is current E-in-C of Pakistan Army Corps of Engineers, Military Engineering Service, and Frontier Works Organisation.

The Engineer-in-Chief commands the Corps of Engineers, Pakistan Army and other military engineering and maintenance corps of the Army. As a senior commander and senior staff officer at the Army General Headquarters (GHQ), the Engineer-in-Chief advises the Army on science and engineering matters and serves as the Army's topographer.

The E-in-C also serves as the proponent for real estate and other science and engineering programs of the Army. As commander of the Pakistan Army Corps of Engineers, the Engineer-in-Chief leads a major Army Engineering command in civil and military infrastructure programs. This office defines policy and guidance and plans direction for the organizations within the Corps.

Rank Structure and Uniform Insignia

Notable Engineers-in-Chief

Lieutenant-General Muhammad Anwar Khan
Major General     Saad Tarique, 1972-1974 
Lieutenant-General Zahid Ali Akbar Khan
Lieutenant-General Javed Nasir, 1991-1992
Lieutenant General Ziauddin Butt
Lieutenant General Shahid Niaz, HI(M)
Lieutenant General Asif Ali
Lieutenant General Khalid Asghar
Lieutenant General Muhammad Afsar
Major General Muhammad Ajmal Iqbal

Notes

Pakistan Army
Pakistan Army appointments